The 1988 Tour de Suisse was the 52nd edition of the Tour de Suisse cycle race and was held from 14 June to 23 June 1988. The race started in Dübendorf and finished in Zürich. The race was won by Helmut Wechselberger of the Malvor–Bottecchia team.

General classification

References

1988
Tour de Suisse